Zhou Yan may refer to:

Zhou Yan (curler) (born 1982), Chinese curler
Zhou Yan (softball) (born 1979), Chinese softball player
GAI (musician) (born 1987), birth name Zhou Yan, Chinese singer and songwriter
Yan Zhou (curler) (born 1992), Chinese wheelchair curler